Basilica di Sant'Eufemia  is a church in Milan, Italy. It was established in 472.

History
The church was built in 472 by Bishop Senatore to house the relics of the martyr Euphemia. The bishop is buried in the church.

Sant'Eufemia was subsequently the subject of various alterations funded by generous patrons. The church was then rebuilt in the 15th century. Canon Pietro Casola describes a rogation day procession that left from the Cathedral of Santa Tecla to Sant'Eufemia and other churches before returning to the cathedral.
 

The church underwent renovation in 1870 by architect Enrico Terzaghi, who designed a neo-romanesque facade of terracotta and Vicenza stone. The rose window above the entrance is surrounded by bas-reliefs with symbols of the four evangelists.

The interior is neo-Gothic; both the walls and vaults are richly decorated with frescoes. 
The Madonna and Child is by Marco d'Oggiono. Simone Peterzano's Pentecost was originally painted for San Paolo Converso.

References

Babila
472 establishments
Romanesque architecture in Milan
5th-century establishments in Italy